The Tabernacle (משכן), or Tent of the Convocation (Heb. אוהל מועד) according to the Book of Exodus, was a movable tent and worship facility used by the Israelites.

Tabernacle may also refer to:

Generic religious terms 
 Church tabernacle, a small cupboard, chest, or cabinet in which the consecrated hosts are kept
 Tabernacle (Methodist), the centre of a camp meeting
 Tabernacle (LDS Church), a multipurpose building used for worship and as a community center by Mormons.  
 Tabernacle societies, lay Eucharistic Adorative associations within Roman Catholic parishes, principally in America and Australia
 Tabernacle, a name for a local church (disambiguation)
 Tin tabernacle, common name for church and related buildings made of corrugated iron
 Aedicula or tabernacle, a nook or frame intended for a tabernacle shrine
 The biblical Jewish holiday named Sukkot, or the Feast of Tabernacles.

Particular religious buildings

Israel
 Temple in Jerusalem,  the successor to the moveable Jewish Tabernacle (משכן) erected by the Israelites in early Jerusalem

United Kingdom

England
 Metropolitan Tabernacle, a large Reformed Baptist church in the Elephant and Castle in London

Wales
 Tabernacle Chapel, Abercynon, Rhondda Cynon Taf (Presbyterian Church of Wales)
 Tabernacle Chapel, Aberdare, Rhondda Cynon Taf (Congregational)
 Tabernacle Chapel, Cardiff (Baptist)
 Tabernacle Chapel, Llandovery, Carmarthenshire (Presbyterian Church of Wales)
 Tabernacle Chapel, Llanelli, Carmarthenshire (Independent)
 Tabernacle Chapel, Morriston, Swansea (Independent)
 Tabernacle Chapel, Roath, Cardiff (Independent)
 Tabernacle Chapel, Ynysybwl, Rhondda Cynon Taf, Wales (Independent)

United States
 Dime Tabernacle, the fourth Seventh-day Adventist church to be built in Berrien Springs, Michigan
 Salt Lake Tabernacle, a religious meeting building in Salt Lake City, Utah, also known as the Mormon Tabernacle
 Whitefield's Tabernacle (disambiguation), name of several churches

Other buildings and venues
 The Tabernacle, Notting Hill, an arts venue in London, England
 The Tabernacle, Machynlleth, an arts venue in Machynlleth, Powys, Wales
 Tabernacle (concert hall), a concert venue in Atlanta, Georgia, United States
 The Tabernacle, a spectators' building at Mote Park, in Maidstone, Kent, England
 Central Pentecostal Tabernacle, former home of the North Pointe Community Church, Edmonton, Alberta, Canada

Places
 Tabernacle, Alabama, United States
 Tabernacle Township, New Jersey, United States
 Tabernacle, Virginia, United States

Art, entertainment, and media
 Tabernacle of Unity, 2006 Bahá'í book
 "Tabernacle", a song from Layers (Royce da 5'9" album)
 Tabernacle at Pendrell Vale, a Magic: The Gathering card
 Bourbon Tabernacle Choir, a rock band from Toronto

Education
 Tabernacle Christian Academy, a Christian school in Poughkeepsie, New York, United States
 Tabernacle Christian School, a private Christian School in Gardendale, Alabama, United States
 Tabernacle School District, a community public school district Tabernacle Township, in Burlington County, New Jersey, United States

Other
 Tabernacle (sailing), the frame on which the heel of a detachable or folding mast is mounted
 Quebec French profanity, the most used and strongest French language profanity in Canada